Alexandrina Miltcheva (born 27 November 1934, in Smyadovo) is a Bulgarian operatic mezzo-soprano.

Career 

After making her debut at the State Opera of Varna as Dorabella in Mozart's Così fan tutte, she won first prize at the Concours international de chant de Toulouse.

She has been a member of the Sofia National Opera since 1968.

She has sung the main roles of the repertoire on major international stages such as the Opéra Garnier in Paris, La Scala of Milan, the Teatro di San Carlo of Naples, the Verona Arena, and also the Bavarian State Opera.

She has sung mezzo-soprano roles by Verdi, Mozart, Rossini, as well as lieder by Mahler and other composers, and songs by Moussorgsky and Tchaikovsky, with conductors such as Sir Georg Solti, Herbert von Karajan, and Riccardo Muti.

She has recorded many discs. She teaches singing and founded her own school in 1994.

See also

References

External links 
 Personal website
 Biography on Operissimo.com (accessdate 22 October 2018)
 
Her page on the Stars of Bulgarian Opera site with 4 mp3 audio clips of selected arias
 Alexandrina Miltcheva Georges Bizet - Carmen - Habanera (YouTube)

1934 births
Living people
Operatic mezzo-sopranos
20th-century Bulgarian women opera singers
Bulgarian music educators
Women music educators
Bulgarian mezzo-sopranos